Lengefeld is a village in the municipality of Unstruttal, Thuringia, Germany. A formerly independent municipality, it was merged into the new municipality Anrode in January 1997. On 1 January 2023 Anrode was disbanded, and Lengefeld became part of the municipality Unstruttal.

References

Former municipalities in Thuringia
Unstrut-Hainich-Kreis